The former First Church of Christ, Scientist in Forest Grove, Oregon, United States, is a historic Christian Science church built in 1916. It was designed by Spencer S. Beman, son of the noted designer of Christian Science churches, Solon Spencer Beman who had died in 1914. On January 21, 1994, it was added to the National Register of Historic Places.

History
First Church of Christ Scientist, Forest Grove was designed by Chicago architect Spencer S. Beman, son and partner of architect, Solon Spencer Beman.

Current use
First Church of Christ Scientist, Forest Grove was downgraded to the Christian Science Society, Forest Grove, but is no longer an active Christian Science congregation.

See also
List of Registered Historic Places in Oregon
 First Church of Christ, Scientist (disambiguation)
List of former Christian Science churches, societies and buildings

References

External links
 National Register listings for Washington County, Oregon
 Christian Science Church listings for Oregon 

Former Christian Science churches, societies and buildings in Oregon
Buildings and structures in Forest Grove, Oregon
National Register of Historic Places in Washington County, Oregon
Churches on the National Register of Historic Places in Oregon
Churches in Washington County, Oregon